McKenzie Corner is a rural community in New Brunswick, Canada. There are two churches in the settlement: McKenzie Corner Baptist Church, which features a cemetery, and St. John's United Church.

The businessman and politician James Kidd Flemming lived in McKenzie Corner, where he died in 1927.

History  
The settlement was once known as McKenzie's Corner and was named after William McKenzie, who settled in 1822. In 1866, McKenzie Corner was a farming settlement with around 140 families present. In 1871, it was a station on the New Brunswick and Canada Railway. In 1898, the population had increased to 150, and there was a post office, a cheese factory and two churches.

The settlement Springbrook, in Hastings County, was once also known under the similar name McKenzie's Corners.

See also
List of communities in New Brunswick

References

Communities in Carleton County, New Brunswick